José Luis Espinosa Arroyo (born 14 July 1991), known as Tiri, is a Spanish footballer who plays for Indian Super League club ATK Mohun Bagan FC as a defender.

He never played any higher than Segunda División B in his own country, where he made 90 appearances for three clubs. He played over 100 matches in the Indian Super League for ATK, Jamshedpur and ATK Mohun Bagan, winning the title with the first team in 2016 and being at one point the most-capped foreign player in the history of the competition.

Club career

Cádiz
Born in Los Barrios, Province of Cádiz, Tiri began his career at Cádiz CF. He was mostly associated to the reserves during his spell and only collected two first-team appearances, the first occurring on 10 May 2009 at the age of 17 as he played the final 25 minutes of a 2–1 Segunda División B away win against CD Guadalajara.

On 1 September 2010, Tiri played the full 90 minutes of a 3–1 home defeat of CE L'Hospitalet in the first round of the Copa del Rey, at the Estadio Ramón de Carranza.

Atlético Madrid
Tiri transferred to Atlético Madrid in 2012, being assigned to their B side also in the third tier. He was first choice during his three-year spell, being relegated to the Tercera División in his last season.

ATK
On 18 June 2015, Tiri signed for Indian Super League defending champions ATK at the same time as compatriot Jaime Gavilán, joining Borja Fernández and Josemi in the club's Spanish contingent. An unused substitute for their first two matches of the campaign, he made his debut on 7 October by playing the entirety of a 1–1 draw at FC Goa in place of Arnab Mondal, who was away playing internationally for India. 

Tiri totalled 1,170 minutes of action, in an eventual elimination in the semi-finals by Chennaiyin FC.

Return to Atlético B
Tiri returned to Atlético Madrid and its B team on 1 February 2016. However, before playing a game for them, on 16 March he agreed terms to go back to Kolkata for the next season.

ATK return
Tiri played 11 matches in his second spell at the Salt Lake Stadium. One of those was in the ISL final, a penalty shootout victory over Kerala Blasters FC on 18 December 2016, thus winning him his first league title.

Marbella
On 24 January 2017, Tiri returned to Spain's third division, signing with Marbella FC in his native Andalusia. In the second of his six appearances, he was sent off in a 2–1 home loss to Lorca FC.

Jamshedpur
Tiri returned to the Indian top flight in July 2017, joining expansion team Jamshedpur FC. He played every minute as they finished in fifth, one place off the playoffs, and scored in a 3–2 home win against Delhi Dynamos FC on 21 January 2018.

ATK Mohun Bagan
On 12 September 2020, Tiri moved to newly merged ATK Mohun Bagan FC. He made his official debut on 20 November, in a 1–0 away defeat of Kerala Blasters.

Career statistics

Honours
ATK
Indian Super League: 2016

References

External links

1991 births
Living people
People from Campo de Gibraltar
Sportspeople from the Province of Cádiz
Spanish footballers
Footballers from Andalusia
Association football defenders
Segunda División B players
Tercera División players
Cádiz CF B players
Cádiz CF players
Atlético Madrid B players
Marbella FC players
Indian Super League players
ATK (football club) players
Jamshedpur FC players
ATK Mohun Bagan FC players
Spanish expatriate footballers
Expatriate footballers in India
Spanish expatriate sportspeople in India